Don Edmunds (September 23, 1930 – August 11, 2020) was an American racecar driver and car builder.

Racing career
He changed the nose on his first Kurtis midget car from Kurtis' design to his own. Indy car builder Eddie Kuzma hired Edmunds to fix the dent in Jimmy Bryan’s car after the driver kicked the car.

He had his first start at Indianapolis Motor Speedway in 1957. He won the 1957 Indianapolis 500 Rookie of the Year after finishing nineteenth over Bill Cheesbourg, Elmer George, Mike Magill, and Eddie Sachs. Edmunds' Indy career ended with a serious practice accident at the Speedway in 1958.

He founded Autoresearch, Inc. in Anaheim, California, which specialized in building midget cars and sprint cars. Edmunds created the blueprints and did most of the fabrication work on the original Bill Thomas Cheetah prototype sports car racer. His chassis won several National Midget Championships in the late 1960s and early 1970s. In the 1970s, Edmunds was a prolific constructor of Formula Super Vee cars. He became a collector and restorer of old race cars.

Edmunds built Evel Knievel's Snake River Canyon Sky cycle.

Career awards
Edmunds was named to the National Sprint Car Hall of Fame in 1991.
He was inducted in the National Midget Auto Racing Hall of Fame in 1994.

Death
Born in Santa Ana, California, Edmunds died in August 2020, aged 89 in Gold Beach, OR.

Indianapolis 500 results

Complete Formula One World Championship results
(key)

References

External links
Official website

1930 births
Indianapolis 500 drivers
Indianapolis 500 Rookies of the Year
2020 deaths
National Sprint Car Hall of Fame inductees
Sportspeople from Santa Ana, California
Racing drivers from California
Champ Car drivers
American racecar constructors
American automobile designers
IndyCar Series people